Pinkie may refer to:

Biology
 Pinky finger or little finger
 Pinkie, a baby mouse used as a food for exotic pets
 Bilby or pinkie, an animal in Southern Australia
 Pinkie, a rosemary cultivar

People
 Pinkie Barnes (1915–2012), English international table tennis champion
 Stuart 'Pinkie' Bates, Hammond organ player with the band The Divine Comedy
 Bob Davie (ice hockey) (1912–1990), Canadian National Hockey League defenceman
 Pinkie Gordon Lane (born 1923), African-American poet, editor and teacher
 Lawrence Stark (1920–2004), Second World War Royal Air Force fighter ace
 Pinkie C. Wilkerson (1948–2000), African American member of the Louisiana House of Representatives; see Louisiana Center for Women in Government and Business Hall of Fame

Fictional characters
 Pinkie Brown, a character in Graham Greene's novel Brighton Rock
 Pinkie Leroy, a character in the 1950 Noël Coward musical Ace of Clubs
 Pinkie Pie, a character in the My Little Pony franchise
 Pinkie Wingate, Judy Garland’s character in the 1938 film Listen, Darling

Other uses
 Pinkie (painting), a 1794 portrait by Thomas Lawrence
 Pinkie House, a historic Scottish mansion
 Pinkie Road, a proposed highway in Saskatchewan, Canada
 Battle of Pinkie, a battle between Scotland and England in 1547.

See also
 
 Pinky (disambiguation)